Garfield is a town in Benton County, Arkansas, United States. The population was 502 at the 2010 census. It is part of the Northwest Arkansas region.

History
Garfield was platted in 1883. A post office has been in operation at Garfield since 1887.

Geography
Garfield is located in northeast Benton County at  (36.450152, -93.973519). U.S. Route 62 passes through the town, leading northeast to Gateway near the Missouri border and southwest to Rogers.

Demographics

At the 2000 census, there were 490 people, 177 households and 136 families residing in the town. The racial makeup of the town was 97.35% White, 1.43% Native American, 0.61% Asian, and 0.61% from two or more races.  1.43% of the population were Hispanic or Latino of any race.

There were 177 households, of which 37.9% had children under the age of 18 living with them, 67.2% were married couples living together, 6.2% had a female householder with no husband present, and 22.6% were non-families. 18.1% of all households were made up of individuals, and 7.3% had someone living alone who was 65 years of age or older. The average household size was 2.77 and the average family size was 3.18.

29.4% of residents were under the age of 18, 8.4% from 18 to 24, 28.8% from 25 to 44, 20.2% from 45 to 64, and 13.3% who were 65 years of age or older. The median age was 37 years. For every 100 females, there were 109.4 males. For every 100 females age 18 and over, there were 104.7 males.

The median household income was $33,393 and the median family income was $38,750. Males had a median income of $27,031 versus $22,404 for females. The per capita income for the town was $13,159. About 9.8% of families and 10.3% of the population were below the poverty line, including 9.0% of those under age 18 and 3.8% of those age 65 or over.

Education 

Public education for early childhood, elementary and secondary school students in most of Garfield is provided by the Rogers School District. A northern portion is within the Pea Ridge School District. The former school district operates Garfield Elementary School, and this school feeds into Lingle Middle School and Rogers Heritage High School. The latter school district operates Pea Ridge High School.

References

External links

Town of Garfield official website

Towns in Benton County, Arkansas
Towns in Arkansas
Northwest Arkansas
1883 establishments in Arkansas